This article lists the presidents of the Senate of Colombia since 1966.

See also
 List of presidents of the Chamber of Representatives of Colombia
 List of vice presidents of Colombia
 List of presidents of Colombia
 List of viceroys of New Granada

Colombia, Senate
Senate